Disco and Atomic War (Estonian: Disko ja tuumasõda) is a 2009 Estonian documentary film written by Jaak Kilmi. In the film, Kilmi talks about illegally watching Finnish television in Communist Estonia as a boy. He describes, amongst others, how his father made special converters for Soviet television sets to watch Finnish TV, his mother made TV guides for Finnish television that he would then sell at school, and popularity of Dallas and Knight Rider in 1980s Estonia.

Awards and nominations

 2009 Warsaw Film Festival Documentary Competition: Best Documentary
 2009 Jihlava International Documentary Film Festival: Silver Eye for Best Full-Length Documentary
 2009 Tallinn Black Nights Film Festival, full-length Baltic films: nomination, International Federation of Film Critics Best Baltic Film
 7th EBS International Documentary Festival: Spirit Award

External links
 
 

2009 films